Places in the United Kingdom known as Tytherington:

Tytherington, Cheshire
Tytherington, Gloucestershire
Tytherington, Somerset, near Frome
Tytherington, Wiltshire